Szpiro is a Polish Jewish surname, a variant of Shapiro. Notable people with this surname include:

 Abram Szpiro (1912-1943), Polish chess master
 George Szpiro (born 1950), Israeli-Swiss author, journalist, and mathematician
 Lucien Szpiro (1941–2020), French mathematician
 Dawid Szpiro (1922-1944), Victim of the Holocaust
 Szpiro's conjecture

See also
Szapiro